Snooker world ranking points 2009/2010: The official world ranking points for the 96 professional snooker players in the 2009–10 season are listed below. The total points from the seasons 2008–09 and 2009–10 were used to determine the seedings at the start of the 2010/2011 season.

Ranking points 
{| class="wikitable sortable" style="text-align: center;"
|-
! scope=col class=unsortable | No.
! scope=col class=unsortable |  Ch 
! scope=col width="200pt" | Player
! scope=col | Points 08/09
! scope=col | SM
! scope=col | GP
! scope=col | UK
! scope=col | WO
! scope=col | CO
! scope=col | WSC
! scope=col | Points 09/10
! scope=col | Total
|-
| 1 || 3 || style="text-align:left;"| John Higgins
| 31000  || 4480 || 4480 || 6400 || 5000 || 2660 || 3800 || 26820 || 57820
|-
| 2 || 7 || style="text-align:left;"| Neil Robertson
| 22825  || 980 || 7000 || 3040 || 1900 || 2660 || 10000 || 25580 || 48405
|-
| 3 || 2 || style="text-align:left;"| Ronnie O'Sullivan
| 23875  || 7000 || 2660 || 5120 || 3200 || 980 || 5000 || 23960 || 47835
|-
| 4 || 1 || style="text-align:left;"| Ali Carter
| 24100 || 2660 || 980 || 4000 || 4000 || 4480 || 6400 || 22520 || 46620
|-
| 5 || 8 || style="text-align:left;"| Ding Junhui
| 13775 || 3500 || 5600 || 8000 || 700 || 5600 || 3800 || 27200 || 40975
|-
| 6 || 4 || style="text-align:left;"| Stephen Maguire
| 22075 || 980 || 2660 || 5120 || 3200 || 2660 || 3800 || 18420 ||  40495
|-
| 7 || 4 || style="text-align:left;"| Shaun Murphy
| 23475  || 4480 || 980 || 3040 || 700 || 980 || 5000 || 15180 || 38655
|-
| 8 || 7 || style="text-align:left;"| Mark Williams || 14219 || 2660 || 4480 || 3040 || 2500 || 7000 || 3800 || 23480 || 37699
|-
| 9 || 2 || style="text-align:left;"| Mark Selby
| 17925 || 980 || 980 || 4000 || 2500 || 2660 || 6400 || 17520 || 35445 
|-
| 10 || 1 || style="text-align:left;"| Mark Allen|| 17800 || 980 || 3500 || 1120 || 2500 || 4480 || 5000 || 17580 || 35380
|-
| 11 || 1 || style="text-align:left;"| Stephen Hendry
| 16225 || 2660 || 2660 || 3040 || 1900 || 3500 || 3800 || 17560 || 33785
|-
| 12 || 6 || style="text-align:left;"| Ryan Day
| 21250  || 3500 || 980 || 1120 || 2500 || 2660 || 1400 || 12160 || 33410
|-
| 13 || 15 || style="text-align:left;"| Graeme Dott
| 14025  || 1960 || 805 || 2240 || 1900 || 1960 || 8000 || 16865 || 30890
|-
| 14 || 6 || style="text-align:left;"| Marco Fu
| 19275 || 2660 || 980 || 1120 || 700 || 3500 || 1400 || 10360 || 29635
|-
| 15 || 1 || style="text-align:left;"| Mark King
| 14625 || 1960 || 2660 || 3040 || 1900 || 3500 || 1400 || 14460 || 29085
|-
| 16 || 10 || style="text-align:left;"| Liang Wenbo
| 12325 || 5600 || 1960 || 4000 || 575 || 805 || 2800 || 15740 || 28065
|-
| 17 || 1 || style="text-align:left;"| Jamie Cope
| 13763 || 2660 || 2660 || 2240 || 1900 || 1960 || 2800 || 14220 || 27983
|-
| 18 || 4 || style="text-align:left;"| Peter Ebdon
| 14425 || 980 || 3500 || 3040 || 700 || 3500 || 1400 || 13120 || 27545 
|-
| 19 || 7 || style="text-align:left;"| Joe Perry
| 14625 || 980 || 3500 || 1120 || 700 || 2660 || 3800 || 12760 || 27385
|-
| 20 ||  || style="text-align:left;"| Ricky Walden
| 15825  || 3500 || 1960 || 2240 || 575 || 805 || 1150 || 10230 || 26055
|-
| 21 || 4 || style="text-align:left;"| Barry Hawkins
| 14200 || 2660 || 805 || 920 || 1900 || 1960 || 2800 || 11045 || 25245
|-
| 22 || 1 || style="text-align:left;"| Steve Davis
| 14975 || 805 || 805 || 2240 || 575 || 805 || 5000 || 10230 || 25205
|-
| 23 || 2 || style="text-align:left;"| Stephen Lee
| 13619 || 1960 || 805 || 3040 || 575 || 805 || 2800 || 9985 || 23604
|-
| 24 ||  || style="text-align:left;"| Michael Holt
| 14275 || 1960 || 805 || 2240 || 575 || 805 || 2800 || 9185 || 23460
|-
| 25 || 1 || style="text-align:left;"| Matthew Stevens
| 12669 || 2660 || 1960 || 2240 || 1900 || 805 || 1150 || 10715 || 23384
|-
| 26 || 21 || style="text-align:left;"| Mark Davis
| 9875 || 1610 || 2660 || 1840 || 1400 || 1960 || 3800 || 13270 || 23145
|-
| 27 || 3 || style="text-align:left;"| Judd Trump
| 14200 || 805 || 805 || 2240 || 1400 || 1960 || 1150 || 8360 || 22560
|-
| 28 || 4 || style="text-align:left;"| Gerard Greene
| 10513 || 1960 || 1960 || 2240 || 575 || 1960 || 2800 || 11495 || 22008
|-
| 29 || 8 || style="text-align:left;"| Stuart Bingham
| 10644 || 2660 || 1960 || 3040 || 1400 || 805 || 1150 || 11015 || 21659
|-
| 30 || 14 || style="text-align:left;"| Ken Doherty
| 7794 || 3500 || 2660 || 1840 || 1150 || 1610 || 2800 || 13560 || 21354
|-
| 31 || 12 || style="text-align:left;"| Dave Harold
| 14363 || 805 || 805 || 920 || 1400 || 805 || 1150 || 5885 || 20248
|-
| 32 || 11 || style="text-align:left;"| Andrew Higginson
| 10550  || 1960 || 630 || 1840 || 1900 || 1960 || 900 || 9190 || 19740
|-
| 33 || 5 || style="text-align:left;"| Mike Dunn
| 10288 || 630 || 1610 || 2240 || 450 || 1960 || 2300 || 9190 || 19478
|-
| 34 || 5 || style="text-align:left;"| Rory McLeod
| 10238 || 630 || 630 || 2240 || 1150 || 1960 || 2300 || 8910 || 19148
|-
| 35 || 2 || style="text-align:left;"| Stuart Pettman
| 11607 || 1610 || 630 || 720 || 1150 || 630 || 2800 || 7540 || 19147 
|-
| 36 || 19 || style="text-align:left;"| Robert Milkins
| 7857 || 1260 || 3500 || 1840 || 900 || 1960 || 1800 || 11260 || 19117
|-
| 37 || 3 || style="text-align:left;"| Jamie Burnett
| 11250 || 1610 || 1960 || 720 || 450 || 1610 || 900 || 7250 || 18500
|-
| 38 || 9 || style="text-align:left;"| Nigel Bond
| 9082  || 1960 || 1960 || 920 || 575 || 2660 || 1150 || 9225 || 18307 
|-
| 39 || 17 || style="text-align:left;"| Joe Swail
| 11919 || 1960 || 805 || 920 || 575 || 805 || 1150 || 6215 || 18134
|-
| 40 || 5 || style="text-align:left;"| Marcus Campbell
| 8663 || 1960|| 1960 || 720 || 1400 || 630 || 2800 || 9470 || 18133
|-
| 41 || 8 || style="text-align:left;"| Tom Ford
| 8313 || 455 || 1260 || 2240 || 1400 || 1610 || 2800 || 9765 || 18078
|-
| 42 || 9 || style="text-align:left;"| Anthony Hamilton
| 10913 || 1610 || 630 || 2240 || 1150 || 630 || 900 || 7160 || 18073
|-
| 43 || 3 || style="text-align:left;"| Martin Gould
| 10232 || 1610 || 630 || 720 || 450 || 630 || 3800 || 7840 || 18072
|-
| 44 || 2 || style="text-align:left;"| Adrian Gunnell
| 7950 || 1610 || 1610 || 1840 || 450 || 1610 || 2300 || 9420 || 17370
|-
| 45 || 11 || style="text-align:left;"| Dominic Dale
| 9307 || 1610 || 1610 || 1840 || 1400 || 630 || 900 || 7990 || 17297
|-
| 46 || 5 || style="text-align:left;"| Alan McManus
| 9863 || 630 || 630 || 720 || 1150 || 1610 || 2300 || 7040 || 16903 
|-
| 47 || 16 || style="text-align:left;"| Fergal O'Brien
| 8082 || 805 || 805 || 920 || 1400 || 1960 || 2800 || 8690 || 16772
|-
| 48 || 13 || style="text-align:left;"| Ian McCulloch
| 8769 || 630 || 1960 || 720 || 1150 || 630 || 2300 || 7390 || 16159
|-
| 49 || 12 || style="text-align:left;"| Rod Lawler
| 7870 || 1260 || 1610 || 520 || 325 || 1960 || 2300 || 7975 || 15845
|-
| 50 || 14 || style="text-align:left;"| Peter Lines
| 7150  || 1260 || 1610 || 4000 || 325 || 455 || 650 || 8300 || 15450
|-
| 51 || 17 || style="text-align:left;"| Matthew Selt
| 6825 || 1960 || 1960 || 1440 || 900 || 910 || 1300 || 8470 || 15295
|-
| 52 || 16 || style="text-align:left;"| Michael Judge
| 8257 || 630 || 630 || 1840 || 1400 || 1610 || 900 || 7010 || 15267
|-
| 53 || 3 || style="text-align:left;"| Andy Hicks
| 9932 || 455 || 455 || 1440 || 900 || 1260 || 650 || 5160 || 15092
|-
| 54 ||  || style="text-align:left;"| Tony Drago
| 5850 || 1260 || 1260 || 1440 || 1400 || 1960 || 1800 || 9120 || 14970
|-
| 55 || 4 || style="text-align:left;"| David Gilbert
| 7975 || 1610 || 1610 || 520 || 900 || 1260 || 650 || 6550 || 14525 
|-
| 56 || 8 || style="text-align:left;"| Jimmy Michie
| 8025  || 630 || 630 || 1840 || 450 || 630 || 2300 || 6480 || 14505
|-
| 57 || 5 || style="text-align:left;"| Barry Pinches
| 6395 || 455 || 2660 || 520 || 1150 || 1260 || 1800 || 7845 || 14240
|-
| 58 || 1 || style="text-align:left;"| Mark Joyce
| 6438 || 455 || 1960 || 1440 || 325 || 1260 || 2300 || 7740 || 14178 
|-
| 59 || 1 || style="text-align:left;"| David Morris
| 7407 || 455 || 1610 || 520 || 900 || 455 || 2300 || 6240 || 13647
|-
| 60 || 4 || style="text-align:left;"| Jimmy White
| 8250 || 1260 || 455 || 0 || 900 || 455 || 1800 || 4870 || 13120
|-
| 61 || 2 || style="text-align:left;"| Joe Delaney
| 7282 || 1260 || 455 || 1440 || 325 || 455 || 1800 || 5735 || 13017
|-
| 62 ||  || style="text-align:left;"| Bjorn Haneveer
| 5850 || 910 || 910 || 320 || 900 || 1960 || 1800 || 6800 || 12650
|-
| 63 ||  || style="text-align:left;"| Jimmy Robertson
| 5850 || 1610 || 280 || 1440 || 650 || 1260 || 1300 || 6540 || 12390
|-
| 64 || 10 || style="text-align:left;"| Paul Davies
| 7438 || 455 || 1260|| 520 || 325 || 455 || 1800 || 4815 || 12253
|-
| 65 || 12 || style="text-align:left;"| John Parrott
| 7400  || 455 || 1260 || 1440 || 325 || 455 || 650 || 4585 || 11985
|-
| 66 || 6 || style="text-align:left;"| Simon Bedford
| 6200 || 1610 || 910 || 1440 || 200 || 280 || 1300 || 5740 || 11940
|-
| 67 || 7 || style="text-align:left;"| Jin Long
| 7888 || 455 || 455 || 520 || 325 || 455 || 1800 || 4010 || 11898 
|-
| 68 ||  || style="text-align:left;"| James Wattana
| 5850 || 280 || 280 || 1040 || 650 || 1960 || 1800 || 6010 || 11860
|-
| 69 ||  || style="text-align:left;"| Matthew Couch
| 6750 || 1260 || 910 || 1040 || 200 || 1260 || 400 || 5070 || 11820 
|-
| 70 || 3 || style="text-align:left;"| Patrick Wallace
| 5875 || 1610 || 1260 || 1040 || 650 || 910 || 400 || 5870 || 11745
|-
| 71 ||  || style="text-align:left;"| Zhang Anda
| 5850 || 280 || 1260 || 320 || 900 || 280 || 2800 || 5840 || 11690
|-
| 72 ||  || style="text-align:left;"| Joe Jogia
| 5850 || 1260 || 910 || 320 || 650 || 1260 || 1300 || 5700 || 11550
|-
| 73 ||  || style="text-align:left;"| Michael White
| 5850 || 1260 || 910 || 1840 || 200 || 910 || 400 || 5520 || 11370 
|-
| 74 ||  || style="text-align:left;"| Ben Woollaston
| 5850 || 910 || 280 || 1440 || 200 || 910 || 1300 || 5040 || 10890
|-
| 75 ||  || style="text-align:left;"| Xiao Guodong
| 5850 || 910 || 280 || 1040 || 900 || 1260 || 400 || 4790 || 10640
|-
| 76 ||  || style="text-align:left;"| Sam Baird
| 5850 || 280 || 280 || 1040 || 200 || 1610 || 1300 || 4710 || 10560
|-
| 77 ||  || style="text-align:left;"| Craig Steadman
| 5850 || 910 || 280 || 1840 || 900 || 280 || 400 || 4610 || 10460
|-
| 78 ||  || style="text-align:left;"| Thepchaiya Un-Nooh
| 5850 || 280 || 910 || 1840 || 900 || 280 || 400 || 4610 || 10460 
|-
| 79 || 14 || style="text-align:left;"| David Gray
| 5320 || 280 || 910 || 320 || 200 || 910 || 1800 || 4420 || 9740
|-
| 80 || 12 || style="text-align:left;"| Lee Spick
| 6625 || 1610 || 280 || 320 || 200 || 280 || 400 || 3090 || 9715
|-
| 81 || 10 || style="text-align:left;"| Li Hang
| 6250 || 0 || 1260 || 320 || 1150 || 280 || 400 || 3410 || 9660
|-
| 82 || 23 || style="text-align:left;"| Liu Song
| 4895 || 455 || 1260 || 520 || 1400 || 455 || 650 || 4740 || 9635
|-
| 83 || 13 || style="text-align:left;"| Daniel Wells
| 6600 || 910 || 910 || 320 || 200 || 280 || 400 || 3020 || 9620
|-
| 84 ||  || style="text-align:left;"| Noppadol Sangnil
| 5850 || 1260 || 280 || 320 || 200 || 280 || 1300 || 3640 || 9490
|-
| 85 ||  || style="text-align:left;"| David Hogan 
| 5850 || 280 || 280 || 1040 || 200 || 280 || 1300 || 3380 || 9230
|-
| 86 || 11 || style="text-align:left;"| Atthasit Mahitthi
| 5850 || 280 || 280 || 1440 || 650 || 280 || 400 || 3330 || 9180 
|-
| 87 ||  || style="text-align:left;"| Brendan O'Donoghue
| 5850 || 910 || 280 || 320 || 200 || 280 || 1300 || 3290 || 9140
|-
| 88 ||  || style="text-align:left;"| Mark Boyle
| 5850 || 280 || 910 || 320 || 0 || 280 || 1300 || 3090 || 8940
|-
| 89 ||  || style="text-align:left;"| Mei Xiwen
| 5850 || 0 || 280 || 320 || 200 || 910 || 1300 || 3010 || 8860
|-
| 90 ||  || style="text-align:left;"| Jordan Brown
| 5850 || 280 || 280 || 1040 || 650 || 280 || 400 || 2930 || 8780
|-
| 91 ||  || style="text-align:left;"| Stephen Rowlings
| 5850 || 280 || 910 || 320 || 650 || 280 || 400 || 2840 || 8690
|-
| 92 ||  || style="text-align:left;"| Chris Norbury 
| 5850 || 280 || 280 || 320 || 200 || 1260 || 400 || 2740 || 8590
|-
| 93 || 31 || style="text-align:left;"| David Roe
| 4320 || 455 || 455 || 520 || 325 || 455 || 1800 || 4010 || 8330
|-
| 94 ||  || style="text-align:left;"| Lee Page
| 5850 || 280 || 280 || 320 || 650 || 280 || 400 || 2210 || 8060
|-
| 95 || 29 || style="text-align:left;"| Ian Preece
| 5645 || 280 || 280 || 320 || 200 || 910 || 400 || 2390 || 8035 
|-
| 96 || 22 || style="text-align:left;"| Andrew Norman
| 5613 || 280 || 910 || 320 || 200 || 280 || 400 || 2390 || 8003
|}

Notes

References

2009
Ranking points 2010
Ranking points 2009